The Type 95 heavy tank was the final result of Japanese multi-turreted tank design, and was in commission during the time period between World War I and World War II. Modeled on German and Italian tank designs, this tank featured 3 turrets. The main armament being a 70 mm cannon in a central turret, with its secondary front turret mounting a 37 mm gun and a 6.5 mm machine gun in the rear turret. Four prototypes were produced in 1934.

History 
After World War I, major powers around the world quickly adopted the revolutionary design of French Renault FT light tank. One of the most successful features on the Renault FT was a 360 degree rotating turret. While developing new single-turreted tanks more closely based on the Renault FT, many countries, including Japan, also experimented with the possibility of multi-turreted designs.

Design

Forerunner Type 91 heavy tank

The Imperial Japanese Army made the decision to develop heavy combat vehicles, which was prompted by the increasing threat posed by the Soviet Union, a potential enemy of Japan in East Asia. In 1931, Japan produced a prototype heavy tank that was designated the Type 91. It was an 18-ton, three turret tank with a BMW IV Inline 6-cylinder gasoline engine. The Type 91 had a Type 90 57 mm cannon as its main armament. Its two smaller auxiliary turrets were each armed with a 6.5 mm machine gun. The tank had a maximum armor plate thickness of 17 mm; same as the prior Type 87 Chi-I prototype. It had seventeen road wheels on each side, which were supported by a "two-stage leaf spring suspension system". This first design was not successful, and the Type 91 project was soon canceled. However, this project became a stepping stone in the development of the Type 95 Heavy tank.

Development of the Type 95

The development of a new multi-turreted tank started in 1932 and was completed in 1934. The overall shape of the Type 95 followed the design of the earlier Type 91, but it had thicker armor and its firepower was significantly improved. Its suspension system was modified from that of the Type 91. While still using a leaf spring suspension, it had only nine road wheels on each side. It was the largest Japanese tank at the time, weighting in at 26 tonne. Four prototypes were produced in 1934. However, the multi-turreted tank concept was cancelled, therefore, the Type 95 did not go into production. It proved to be a complicated design with poor mobility and had a lower top speed than desired.

Modeled on German and Italian tank designs, this tank featured 3 turrets. Mounted in the central turret was the primary weapon of Type 95, a Type 94 7 cm tank gun specifically designed for it. The cannon could fire both Type 92 high-explosive shells and Type 95 armor-piercing shells. The gun elevation angle was 20 degrees and gun depression angle was −12 degrees. A 6.5 mm machine gun was also mounted in the main turret. Two addition turrets gave Type 95 yet more firepower: a Type 94 3.7 cm tank cannon was mounted in one auxiliary turret, and the other rear facing auxiliary turret featured a 6.5 mm machine gun.

Variants

Two chassis were later used as platforms for:

 Experimental 10 cm SPG Hi-Ro Sha or Hiro-sha
 An open top SPG with a front mounted 10 cm cannon (105 mm main gun) on Type 95 heavy tank chassis. A single prototype of the self-propelled gun was built.

 Experimental 10 cm SPG Ji-Ro or Ji-Ro Sha
 An open top SPG with a rear mounted Type 92 10 cm cannon (105 mm main gun) on Type 95 heavy tank chassis, similar to German Elefant. One prototype was built. Originally, the Type 96 15 cm howitzer was considered for mounting on this SPG, but the plans in relation to the howitzer were abandoned.

See also 

 Tanks in the Japanese Army

Citations

General and cited references

External links
 History of War.org
 Taki's Imperial Japanese Army Page - Akira Takizawa

Heavy tanks
History of the tank
Multi-turreted tanks
Tanks of Japan
Tanks of the interwar period